August Victor Paul  Blüthgen (25 July 1880 in Mühlhausen, Thüringen – 2 September 1967 in Naumburg) was a German entomologist who specialised in Hymenoptera.
 
He was a Doctor of Law Jurist and court adviser. Blüthgen described very many new species of Aculeata (bees and wasps).

References
Anonym 1955  [Bluthgen, A. V. P.]  Neues Deutschland (30. 6. 1955)  (Verleihung Leibniz-Medaille), Portr. Konvolut Dorn
Gusenleitner, F. 1991 Wildbienenforschung in Österreich. - Kataloge des Oberösterr. Landesmuseums NF (2. Auflage) 10 103-153 103 - 153, Portrait.
 Nonveiller, G. 1999 The Pioneers of research on the Insects of Dalmatia. Zagreb, Hrvatski Pridodoslovni Muzej : 1-390 149.
Rommel, R.-P. 2002: Biographien Nordwestthüringer Entomofaunisten. Veröff. Naturkundemus. Mus. Erfurt , Erfurt 21: 69-82 75–76.

External links
Google books

German entomologists
Hymenopterists
1967 deaths
1880 births
20th-century German zoologists